Andrew F (born December 28, 1990) is a Canadian Pop/Rock singer and songwriter born in Calgary, Alberta, Canada.

Early life
Andrew F started playing the drums at the age of 14 when he joined his first band Thirty Years' War. He has also been frontman for a few other pop punk bands.

Music
Andrew F released his debut single "The End" which ended up becoming a huge success, peaking at Number 10 on the Canadian Hot 100 based on the large number of digital downloads, which was certified gold by the Music Canada months later. He first worked on demos at Music Center Canada Recording Studios with producer Daron Schofield, but later on all turned out into full production recordings, which would be on his debut album Reckless Abandon. The album was released on May 22, 2008, and the whole entire album was written and sung by Andrew F alone. Andrew F's style of music is Pop, Rock, Folk, and Acoustic. He also plays drums, and the guitar (both acoustic and electric). In 2012, Andrew F joined a newly formed rock band called The Ashley Hundred.

Discography

Albums

Singles

References

External links
 Andrew F's myspace
Pumping: Andrew F – Reckless Abandon, chartattack.com
The mysterious rise of Andrew F., ffwdweekly.com
Andrew F's Twitter

 

1990 births
Living people
Canadian pop singers
Canadian rock singers
Musicians from Calgary
21st-century Canadian male singers